"My Little Secret" is Xscape's second single, produced by Jermaine Dupri, from their third studio album "Traces of My Lipstick". The song reached number nine on the Billboard Hot 100 and number two on Billboard's Hot R&B/Hip-Hop Singles & Tracks, becoming their last single to reach the top ten on both charts. The song talks about a sexual relationship on "the side" while cheating, with lyrics :everybody cheats, but you gotta know how, you gotta know when,; turning into a "little secret" love affair.

This was the last official single by the group before disbanding just after the release of the album.

This song has been sampled by Lil Wayne's Young Money group member and Teen Rapper Lil Twist on his first 2010 single "Little Secret" featuring Jermaine Dupri's protégé Bow Wow.

Formats and track listings
US Maxi CD single
My Little Secret (LP version) – 4:31
My Little Secret (JD remix) – 4:31
My Little Secret (Timbaland remix) – 4:27
My Little Secret (Lil Jon remix) – 5:56
My Little Secret (Lil Jon instrumental) – 5:56

US Promo CD Single
My Little Secret (Radio Edit) – 4:15
My Little Secret (LP Version) – 4:29
My Little Secret (Instrumental) – 4:31
My Little Secret (Callout Hook #1) – 0:10
My Little Secret (Callout Hook #2) – 0:05

US CD Single
My Little Secret (LP Version) – 4:29
I Will (Excerpt) – 1:16
All About Me (Excerpt) – 0:57
All I Need (Excerpt) – 1:03

Charts

Weekly charts

Year-end charts

Certifications

References

1998 singles
Xscape (group) songs
Song recordings produced by Jermaine Dupri
Songs written by Manuel Seal
Songs written by Jermaine Dupri
Songs written by LaTocha Scott
Songs about infidelity
Contemporary R&B ballads
1990s ballads